The First Battle of Manzanillo was a series of naval engagements during the Spanish–American War on 30 June 1898 in and outside of the harbor of Manzanillo, Cuba. Three American gunboats were forced to retire after attacking a squadron of Spanish gunboats and auxiliaries.

Background
After the blockade of Santiago, the Spanish attempted to resupply the city by taking in provisions from ports on the southern coast of Cuba that were not blockaded. Aware of the situation, the American consul at Kingston sent word to the military that the Spanish were preparing to send a resupply convoy from that city to the southern coast. To thwart these efforts, on 28 June President McKinley extended the blockade to include the southern coast of Cuba as well as Puerto Rico. The three American vessels began operations by conducting reconnaissance of the area between Santa Cruz and Manzanillo.

Battle

Action at Niguero
While patrolling near the Niguero Bay, the small,  Spanish gunboat Centinela was sighted, and the Americans decided to engage her. Since Wompatuck had a deep draft, Hornet and Hist moved in close to engage the vessel. Upon nearing her, Centinela opened fire with her two Maxim guns. Spanish troops from the shore also began firing on the Americans but were chased away when their fire was returned. Centinela′s aft gun was knocked out, and the vessel then attempted to escape by maneuvering behind a small cay out of the American's line of sight. This effort proved futile though, since the Americans still managed to hit the vessel, which was run aground by her crew. However, Centinela would later be refloated and join the Spanish squadron at Manzanillo.

Action at Manzanillo
The three gunboats then continued towards Manzanillo, where they were spotted by a squadron of Spanish vessels which consisted of the gunboats Guantánamo, Estrella and Delgado Parejo, each one crewed by 19 sailors and officers, plus three armed pontoons. The pontoons were Guardián, crewed by four gunners manning an old Parrott gun, Cuba Española, an old wooden gunboat armed with a Parrott gun and crewed by seven men, and an old sailboat used as a barracks ship. There were also many commercial vessels in port. The Americans opened fire at 15:20, and the Spanish accurately responded, hitting all three of the ships several times. Hist took several hits, including some near its engine room, and Hornet took a disabling shot to its main steam pipe, severely scalding three men, at least one of which died. Contrary to the American reports, Hist did not sink any Spanish boats before Hornet was towed out of action by Wompatuck, which had only been damaged lightly compared to the other American vessels. As Wompatuck began to tow Hornet, the Spanish began to fire on those vessels. Starting to take damage and casualties, the Americans decided to withdraw, since their gunboats' armaments were not enough to destroy the rest of the Spanish squadron.

Aftermath
Two vessels sent to rendezvous with the Americans arrived a day later, and made another attempt at silencing the Spaniards but were also repulsed. The Spanish vessels were later repaired, leaving the squadron mostly intact. More reinforcements would arrive by mid-July, and on the 18th a third decisive engagement was fought, finally destroying the small Spanish fleet once and for all. Although the fleet was destroyed, the town's garrison continued to hold out until August, when the Fourth Battle of Manzanillo was fought.

See also
 Second Battle of Manzanillo
 Third Battle of Manzanillo

Order of battle

Spain

Gunboats

 Estrella 
 Guantánamo
 Centinela
 Delgado Parejo

Pontoons

 Maria
 Cuba Española
 Guardián

United States

Gunboats
 
 

Armed tugs

Notes

Sources
 
 

Naval battles of the Spanish–American War
Battles involving Cuba
Battle of Manzanillo 01
Battle of Manzanillo 01
Conflicts in 1898
Battle of Manzanillo 01